The Guadalquivir (also ,) is the fifth-longest river in the Iberian Peninsula and the second-longest river with its entire length in Spain. The Guadalquivir is the only major navigable river in Spain. Currently it is navigable from the Gulf of Cádiz to Seville, but in Roman times it was navigable to Córdoba.

Geography 
It rises at Cañada de las Fuentes (village of Quesada) in the Cazorla mountain range (Jaén), flows through Córdoba and Seville and reaches the sea at the fishing village of Bonanza, in Sanlúcar de Barrameda, flowing into the Gulf of Cádiz, in the Atlantic Ocean.

The marshy lowlands at the river's mouth are known as "Las Marismas". The river borders the Doñana National Park reserve.

Name
The modern name of Guadalquivir comes from the Arabic al-wādī l-kabīr, meaning "the big river".

There was a variety of names for the Guadalquivir in Classical and pre-Classical times. According to Titus Livius (Livy), The History of Rome, Book 28, the native people of Tartessians or Turdetanians called the river by two names: Certis (Kertis) and Rherkēs. Greek geographers sometimes called it "the river of Tartessos", after the city of that name. The Romans called it by the name  (which was the basis for name of the province of Hispania Baetica).

History

During a significant portion of the Holocene, the western Guadalquivir valley was occupied by an inland sea, the Tartessian Gulf.

The Phoenicians established the first anchorage grounds and dealt in precious metals. The ancient city of Tartessos (that gave its name to the Tartessian Civilization) was said to have been located at the mouth of the Guadalquivir, although its site has not yet been found.

The Romans, whose name for the river was Baetis, settled in Hispalis (Seville), in the 2nd century BC, making it into an important river port. By the 1st century BC, Hispalis was a walled city with shipyards building longboats to carry wheat. In the 1st century AD the Hispalis was home to entire naval squadrons. Ships sailed to Rome with various products: minerals, salt, fish, etc. During the Arab rule between 712 and 1248 the Moors built a stone dock and the Torre del Oro (Tower of Gold), to reinforce the port defences.

In the 13th century Ferdinand III expanded the shipyards and from Seville's busy port, grain, oil, wine, wool, leather, cheese, honey, wax, nuts and dried fruit, salted fish, metal, silk, linen and dye were exported throughout Europe.

A reconstructed waterwheel is located at Córdoba on the Guadalquivir River. The Molino de la Albolafia waterwheel, originally built by the Romans, provided water for the nearby Alcázar gardens as well as being used to mill flour.

After the discovery of the Americas, Seville became the economic centre of the Spanish Empire as its port monopolised the trans-oceanic trade and the Casa de Contratación (House of Trade) wielded its power. As navigation of the Guadalquivir River became increasingly difficult, Seville's trade monopoly was lost to Cádiz. The construction of the canal known as the Corta de Merlina in 1794 marked the beginning of the modernisation of the port of Seville.

After five years of work (2005–2010), in late November 2010 the new Seville lock designed to regulate tides was finally in operation.

Flooding

The Guadalquivir River Basin occupies an area of 63,085 km² and has a long history of severe flooding.

During the winter of 2010 heavy rainfall caused severe flooding in rural and agricultural areas in the provinces of Seville, Córdoba and Jaén in the Andalusia region. The accumulated rainfall in the month of February was above , double the precipitation for Spain for that month. This was below that recorded in Seville in the flood of 1963 when . was reached. During August 2010, when flooding occurred in Jaén, Córdoba and Seville, three people died in Córdoba.

Pollution
The Doñana disaster, also known as the Aznalcóllar Disaster or Guadiamar Disaster was an industrial accident in Andalusia. In April 1998 a holding dam burst at the Los Frailes mine, near Aznalcóllar, Seville Province, releasing  of mine tailings. The Doñana National Park was also affected by this event.

Dams and bridges

Of the numerous bridges spanning the Guadalquivir, one of the oldest is the Roman bridge of Córdoba. Significant bridges at Seville include the Puente del Alamillo (1992), Puente de Isabel II or Puente de Triana (1852), and Puente del Centenario (completed in 1992).

The El Tranco de Beas Dam at the head of the river was built between 1929 and 1944 as a hydroelectricity project of the Franco regime.
Doña Aldonza Dam is located in the Guadalquivir riverbed, in the Andalusian municipalities of Úbeda, Peal de Becerro and Torreperogil in the province of Jaén.

Ports

The Port of Seville is the main port on the Guadalquivir River. The Port Authority of Seville is responsible for developing, managing, operating, and marketing the Port of Seville.

The entrance to the Port of Seville is protected by a lock that regulates the water level, making the port free of tidal influences. These docks and berths are used for solid and liquid bulk cargoes, roll-on/roll-off cargoes, containers, private vessels and cruise ships.

Almost 1,500 vessels brought cargo into the port, including more than 101,000 TEUs of containerized cargo.

See also 
 List of rivers of Spain

References

External links
 More information from the United Nations Environmental Program.
 Evolution of the Port of Seville.

 
Rivers of Spain